Nivankylä is a village in Rovaniemi, Finland along the Ounasjoki river. The village has more than 600 inhabitants and includes a primary school. It is located just north of the Arctic Circle.

References